Yumeka Sano 佐野夢加 (born 1 June 1985 in Masuho, Yamanashi) is a retired Japanese sprinter. She competed for the Japanese team in the 4 × 100 metres relay at the 2012 Summer Olympics; the team placed 15th with a time of 44.25 in Round 1 and did not qualify for the final.

Personal best

International competition

References

External links

Yumeka Sano at JAAF 

1985 births
Living people
Sportspeople from Yamanashi Prefecture
Japanese female sprinters
Olympic athletes of Japan
Athletes (track and field) at the 2012 Summer Olympics
Athletes (track and field) at the 2010 Asian Games
Asian Games medalists in athletics (track and field)
Asian Games bronze medalists for Japan
Medalists at the 2010 Asian Games
Olympic female sprinters
20th-century Japanese women
21st-century Japanese women